Miguel Ángel Trauco Saavedra (born 25 August 1992) is a Peruvian professional footballer who plays as a left-back and left midfielder for the San Jose Earthquakes of Major League Soccer and the Peru national team.

Trauco's polished technique, precise passing, and great dribbling skills have made him an asset in the attacking force of his team as well as a solid defender. With his great capabilities to unfold himself into the attacking and defending areas of the field, Trauco is a sharp contributor in any situation.

Early life
Trauco was born in Tarapoto; he is the son of Miguel Trauco Alvarado and Bessy Saavedra Armas.

Club career
Trauco started his career in the Copa Perú division with Unión Comercio in 2010. He made six appearances in the National Stage that season including the two matches against Alianza Unicachi in the Final. His side won on away goals and were promoted to the First Division the following season. In 2016, he signed for Universitario de Deportes.

In October 2016 Brazilian and Peruvian press reported rumors about Flamengo's possible interest for signing Trauco. Shortly after, on 13 December 2016, Trauco gave an interview to Peruvian newspaper Libero confirming his transfer to Flamengo for the 2017 season. However, the Brazilian club did not confirm any signing, saying they are still negotiating with Trauco.

Trauco was elected 2016 Peruvian Primera División best player with 39 appearances, one goal and 11 assists.

Flamengo
After many rumors in the press Flamengo announced officially Traucos's signing, on 14 December 2016. He signed a three-year contract with the Brazilian club. He debuted for his new club on 28 January 2017 scoring a goal and two assists against Boavista, in the opening match of the 2017 Campeonato Carioca.

After Flamengo signed Filipe Luís Trauco lost space and became the team's third left back. As he only had five more months under his contract the Brazilian club decided to accept a low offer from Saint-Étienne to avoid losing Trauco on a free transfer.

Saint-Étienne
On 31 July 2019, Flamengo announced that they would accept a €600,000 offer for Trauco from Ligue 1 club Saint-Étienne.

San Jose Earthquakes
On 2 September 2022, Trauco signed with Major League Soccer side San Jose Earthquakes on a one-and-a-half year deal.

International career

Trauco debuted for the Peru national team on 6 August 2014 as a substitute in a 3–0 win against Panama. He also appeared as a substitute in a match against Iran on 4 September 2014.

He returned to the national team in 2016 and has been a fixture at left-back ever since. He started in all thirteen of his appearances in 2018 FIFA World Cup qualifying matches between 2016 and 2017, including Peru's intercontinental playoff victory against New Zealand which qualified Peru for their first FIFA World Cup since 1982.

Copa América Centenario
On 17 May 2016, Trauco was named to the Peru national team for the Copa América Centenario in the United States. He started all four matches for Peru as they won their group, but missed his penalty in a shootout loss to Colombia in the quarter-finals.

2018 FIFA World Cup
On 14 May 2018, Trauco was named to the Peru national team for the 2018 World Cup in Russia. He started all three matches for the squad in the group stage.

2019 Copa América
On 30 May 2019, Trauco was named to the Peru national team for the 2019 Copa América in Brazil by manager Ricardo Gareca. He started all six matches for Peru throughout the tournament, including the final on 7 July, which ended in a 3–1 defeat to hosts Brazil. For his performances, Trauco was named to the Team of the Tournament by CONMEBOL.

Career statistics

Club

International

Honours
Unión Comercio
Copa Perú: 2010

Universitario
Peruvian Primera División: Apertura 2016

Flamengo
Campeonato Carioca: 2017, 2019 
Saint-Étienne

 Coupe de France runner-up: 2019–20

Individual
Peruvian Primera División Player of the Year: 2016
Campeonato Carioca Team of the Year: 2017
Copa América Team of the Tournament: 2019

References

External links
 
 

1992 births
Living people
Peruvian footballers
Peru international footballers
Unión Comercio footballers
Club Universitario de Deportes footballers
Association football fullbacks
Copa América Centenario players
CR Flamengo footballers
AS Saint-Étienne players
San Jose Earthquakes players
Peruvian Primera División players
Campeonato Brasileiro Série A players
Ligue 1 players
Championnat National 3 players
Major League Soccer players
Peruvian expatriate sportspeople in Brazil
Peruvian expatriate sportspeople in France
Peruvian expatriate sportspeople in the United States
Peruvian expatriate footballers
Expatriate footballers in Brazil
Expatriate footballers in France
Expatriate soccer players in the United States
2018 FIFA World Cup players
2019 Copa América players
2021 Copa América players
People from Tarapoto